The 2014 La Manga Cup is an exhibition international club football (soccer) competition featuring football club teams from Europe, which was held in February 2014. All matches were played in La Manga Stadium in La Manga, Spain. This was the seventeenth La Manga Cup.

Teams 
The following four clubs participated in the 2014 tournament:

  Aalesund
  Brann
  Sogndal
  Start

Standings

Matches

Winners

References 

La Manga Cup
2014